一筆OUT消 was the Hong Kong edition of the UK show The Weakest Link, presented by Hong Kong actress Carol Cheng in the Cantonese language. The Chinese title of the show is a word play of Chinese idiom 一筆勾銷, which means "Written off".

Purchase
The Show Format and Production License, TVB was quickly bought from The Weakest Link International License Holder BBC Worldwide and ECM Production. Then the show started quickly to air on TVB Jade, after rival ATV took most of the ratings with the Cantonese language version of Who Wants to Be a Millionaire?.  The top prize was HK$3,000,000.  It premiered on August 20, 2001.

Host
As per the licensing agreement, hostess Carol Cheng initially had to act just like Anne Robinson, complete with the same cold and mean style of presenting. BBC staff were present for the first five tapings, and the network and production team had to model the show after the British version. Because Chinese culture typically does not value confrontational behaviour towards people, TVB received many viewers complaints about the show. Bowing to public pressure, the broadcaster changed the style of the show, and Carol Cheng became gentler with the contestants. As a result, the ratings went up, and eventually the show beat Who Wants to be a Millionaire (albeit occasionally) in ratings.  Since TVB ordered only 108 daily weekday shows, the series finale aired on January 18, 2002.

Game play
The game play was identical to that of the U.S. nighttime show, with the first round lasting 2:30 and each succeeding round lasting 10 seconds less than the preceding round, until Round 7, which lasts for 1 minute, 30 seconds for double the stakes or a possible $750,000. The final round is a 5-question shootout in which the player who answers more questions correctly wins all the money, with  "sudden death" play in the event of a tie. Unlike the British version, the first round started with the person whose first character (surname) in their Chinese name is first alphabetically. The money chain for each round is as follows (in HK$):

References

External links

Chinese game shows
Quiz games
TVB original programming
2001 Hong Kong television series debuts
2002 Hong Kong television series endings
Television game shows with incorrect disambiguation
The Weakest Link